Samuel (Samuli) Häkkinen (28 August 1857, Saarijärvi - 6 May 1918, Viipuri) was a Finnish schoolteacher and politician. He was a member of the Parliament of Finland from 1907 to 1908 and from 1913 until his death in 1918. During the Finnish Civil War, he sided with the Reds, was made prisoner by White troops and was shot in Viipuri on 6 May 1918.

References

1857 births
1918 deaths
People from Saarijärvi
People from Vaasa Province (Grand Duchy of Finland)
Social Democratic Party of Finland politicians
Members of the Parliament of Finland (1907–08)
Members of the Parliament of Finland (1913–16)
Members of the Parliament of Finland (1916–17)
Members of the Parliament of Finland (1917–19)
Finnish schoolteachers
People of the Finnish Civil War (Red side)
People executed by Finland by firing squad
20th-century executions by Finland